Abdulaziz Fayez Subait Khalifa Al Alawi (born 17 June 1990) is an Emirati footballer commonly known as Azooz or Abdulaziz Fayez, who currently plays as a winger.

Early life

Abdulaziz was born on 17 June 1990, in Al Ain, UAE, he descended from a family sport, his father Fayez Subait was a player in the Al Ain Club and his brothers too, play in same club, Fawzi as right defender, Mohammed as left defender, hazza as centre forward, he is the third son in the family.

Club career

Al Ain

2009–10 season 

This season was the first to Abdulaziz with the first team, And began this season when he was selected  by coach Winfried Schaefer, to accompany the first team to camp outside in Switzerland and Spain, On 30 December 2009, Abdulaziz play his first match with the Al Ain first team ، against Bani Yas in an Etisalat Emirates Cup second-leg match being substituted for Shehab Ahmed in the 46th minute, and the match ended 1-1,
On 9 April 2010, Azooz play his first Clasico match against Al-Wahda, and ended 0-1 for Al-Wahda.

Club

1Continental competitions include the AFC Champions League
2Other tournaments include the UAE Super Cup, UAE President Cup and Etisalat Emirates Cup

References

External links
 Abdulaziz Statistics At Goalzz.com

Emirati footballers
United Arab Emirates international footballers
Al Ain FC players
Al-Wasl F.C. players
1990 births
Living people
UAE Pro League players
Association football wingers